A concha bullosa is a pneumatized (air-filled) cavity within a nasal concha, also known as a turbinate. Bullosa refers to the air-filled cavity within the turbinate. It is a normal anatomic variant seen in up to half the population.  Occasionally, a large concha bullosa may cause it to bulge sufficiently to obstruct the opening of an adjacent sinus, possibly leading to recurrent sinusitis and various head pains related to areas innervated by the trigeminal nerve. In such a case the turbinate can be reduced in size by endoscopic nasal surgery (turbinectomy). The presence of a concha bullosa is often associated with deviation of the nasal septum toward the opposite side of the nasal cavity. 

One review of the septal surgery shows that significant relief of pain occurs in 65%-85% of surgeries. Screening of patients can cover presence of headache and facial pain and disability.

Some experts call pain associated with enlarged concha bullosa "rhinogenic contact point headache." In a review article of fifteen other journal articles of surgeries, significant improvements occurred after surgical treatment with a reduction from 88 (73%) to 6 (5%) patients for GRADE 3–4 MIDAS scores, and a corresponding increase in milder symptoms from GRADE 1–2 in 32 (27%) patients at 91 (76%) (p < 0.001).

References

Nose disorders